Abatocera irregularis is a species of beetle in the family Cerambycidae. It was described by Vollenhoven in 1871. It is known from the Celebes Islands.

References

Batocerini
Beetles described in 1871